Veritas School is a private, classical Christian school in Newberg, Oregon, United States. Founded in 1997, it uses the classical education model, with all students receiving a Liberal Arts education.  This includes Math (through Calculus), Science, History, English, Literature, Theology, Foreign Language (Latin is begun in 3rd grade and highschoolers can take four years of French or three of Latin and one of New-Testament Greek), Art, Music, Rhetoric, Formal Logic, and PE.  All subjects are taught with God and His Word at their core.

Veritas has been accredited by the Association of Classical and Christian Schools since October 2007.

The 18 members of the Class of 2013 averaged 1923 on the SAT, placing it in the 89th percentile nationally. Those 18 were offered more than $4.25 million in initial scholarship offers from colleges such as George Fox University, Stanford University, Hillsdale College, Wheaton College, and Baylor University. Two of these seniors received full-ride scholarships.

Since 2005, Veritas has had 24 National Merit honorees.

Veritas School's Concert Choir placed 2nd in the OSAA State Choir Championships in 2009. In 2011 and 2012, the Concert Choir placed 1st, and 2nd in 2013.  In 2014, the choir tied for 1st with Delphian, and they won 1st again in 2015.

Many Veritas students do come from the Newberg/Sherwood/Dundee area, but a number of families do commute or have commuted from such cities as Salem, Milwaukie, Beaverton, Lake Oswego, McMinnville, Forest Grove, and Portland.

Mission statement

"The mission of Veritas School is to cultivate wisdom, virtue, and godliness in its students, faculty, staff, families, and communities by providing an excellent Christ-centered and classical education."

References

1997 establishments in Oregon
Buildings and structures in Newberg, Oregon
Christian schools in Oregon
Classical Christian schools
Educational institutions established in 1997
High schools in Yamhill County, Oregon
Private elementary schools in Oregon
Private high schools in Oregon
Private middle schools in Oregon